Cosmisoma aeneicollis is a species of beetle in the family Cerambycidae. It was described by Ermichson in 1848.

References

Cosmisoma
Beetles described in 1848